Tiger Man is a compilation from American singer and musician Elvis Presley consisting of tracks from his second comeback concert in 1968.

Track listing

References

1998 compilation albums
Elvis Presley compilation albums
RCA Records compilation albums
Compilation albums published posthumously